Peaks-Kenny State Park is a seasonal public recreation area covering  on the south shore of Sebec Lake, mostly located in the town of Dover-Foxcroft, Maine. The state park grounds include a white sand beach at South Cove, 56 campsites, picnic area, hiking trails, and canoe and kayak rentals.

The park is 1 of 5 Maine State Parks that are in the path of totality for the 2024 solar eclipse, with 1 minute and 56 seconds of totality.

History
The area of land that now constitutes the park was donated to the state in 1964 by Francis J. Peaks. The gift was made in memory of his sister, Annie Peaks Kenny, and their parents, Joseph and Eliza Peaks, for whom the park was named.

Landmarks
Norwood Castle sits along the shore of the lake. It was built in 1890 as a wedding gift of wealthy Foxcroft attorney Willis Parsons for his bride. Parsons became the first Commissioner of the Maine Department of Inland Fisheries and Wildlife.

References

External links
Peaks-Kenny State Park Department of Agriculture, Conservation and Forestry
Peaks-Kenny State Park Guide & Map Department of Agriculture, Conservation and Forestry

State parks of Maine
Protected areas of Piscataquis County, Maine
North Maine Woods
Dover-Foxcroft, Maine